Midnight Delight may refer to:

 Midnight Delight, a 1982 Smokie album
 Midnight Delight (film)